Big Box,  Big box, or Big-box may refer to:

Big-box store, a form of retail outlet
Big-box centre or power center, a form of retail outlet
Big Box (device), a device for enabling internet access
Big Box Mart, a 2005 video by JibJab

See also

Big Box Ordinance, a 2006 Chicago living-wage legislation
Big Blue Box, a videogame developer
Big Brown Box, an audio retailer